Valentin Barbero (born 13 July 2000) is an Argentine professional footballer who plays as a midfielder for San Luis de Quillota, on loan from Belgrano.

References

2000 births
Living people
Argentine footballers
Argentine expatriate footballers
Association football midfielders
Sportspeople from Córdoba Province, Argentina
Club Atlético Belgrano footballers
Club Atlético Banfield footballers
San Luis de Quillota footballers
Argentine Primera División players
Primera Nacional players
Primera B de Chile players
Argentine expatriate sportspeople in Chile
Expatriate footballers in Chile